Delfina de la Cruz Zañartu (24 February 1837 Concepción, Chile – 8 May 1905 Concepción, Chile) was a Chilean pianist and First Lady of Chile. She was the only child of General José María de la Cruz and his wife Josefa Zañartu, and granddaughter of Chilean revolutionary Luis de la Cruz.

First Lady of Chile 

De la Cruz became engaged to Aníbal Pinto after he returned from a long trip in Europe, and they married on 24 November 1855 in Concepción. The marriage had political undertones; Pinto's father, Francisco Antonio Pinto, former President of Chile, felt that the marriage would help to heal the relationship between the cities of Concepción and Santiago. Animosity had arisen between the cities as a result of the 1851 Chilean Revolution, during which uprisings had taken place in Concepción against the central government based in Santiago. The marriage would create a familial link between de la Cruz's father, José Maria de la Cruz and Pinto's brother-in-law, Manuel Bulnes, who had fought against each other in the Battle of Loncomilla.

Pinto was elected President of Chile in 1876, and de la Cruz accompanied him to all government ceremonies, even inspecting the troops in his company during the War of the Pacific.

De la Cruz was related by marriage to two other First Ladies of Chile: Enriqueta Pinto, Pinto's sister and wife of Manuel Bulnes, and Luisa Garmendia, Pinto's mother and wife of Fransico Antonio Pinto.

Musical Composition

De la Cruz was an accomplished pianist and composer. Under the pseudonym Delfina Perez, de la Cruz published 12 works throughout the 19th century, surpassed in volume only by Isidora Zegers. Her work was praised by local press in Valparaíso and Santiago, where she sometimes performed benefit concerts. Several of her pieces also attained international recognition, including The Star of Night, a polka for piano which was played in Paris, as well as Armando the Gondolier, a waltz for piano later performed in Germany. She is also the first Chilean woman to venture into the composition of choral music, at the time a male-dominated sphere.

References

First ladies of Chile
1837 births
1905 deaths
People from Concepción, Chile
Women classical composers
Chilean women musicians
Chilean classical composers
Women classical pianists
19th-century classical composers
19th-century women composers
19th-century Chilean women
Musicians from Concepción, Chile
19th-century women pianists